The 1975 Railway Cup Hurling Championship was the 49th staging of the Railway Cup since its establishment by the Gaelic Athletic Association in 1927. The cup began on 16 February 1975 and ended on 17 March 1975.

Leinster were the defending champions.

On 17 March 1975, Leinster won the cup following a 2-09 to 1–11 defeat of Munster in the final. This was their 16th Railway Cup title overall and their fifth title in succession.

Results

Semifinals

Final

Scoring statistics

Top scorers overall

Top scorers in a single game

Bibliography

 Donegan, Des, The Complete Handbook of Gaelic Games (DBA Publications Limited, 2005).

References

Railway Cup Hurling Championship
Railway Cup Hurling Championship
Hurling